The 1992 Women's Roller Hockey World Cup was the first ever roller hockey world cup for women, organized by the Fédération Internationale de Roller Sports. It was contested by 12 national teams (6 from Europe, 2 from North America, 2 from Oceania, 1 from Africa and 1 from Asia). The chosen city to host the world cup was Springe, in Germany. This inaugural edition was won by Canada's squad, with eleven victories in eleven matches.

The tournament was played with the traditional quads except for the Canadian team, who wore inline skates.

Results

Standings

See also
 FIRS Women's Roller Hockey World Cup

External links
 1992 Women's World Cup in rink-hockey.net historical database

Women's Roller Hockey World Cup
International roller hockey competitions hosted by Germany
World
Roll